Canada Cup 2016 was a fighting game event that took place in Toronto, Canada on October 28–30. The seventh incarnation of the Canada Cup hosted 14 tournaments: games that were played at the event ranged from Street Fighter II Turbo to The King of Fighters XIV. The Street Fighter V tournament held at Canada Cup 2016 was the last Premier Event of the 2016 Capcom Pro Tour: its champion NuckleDu automatically qualified to compete in the 2016 Capcom Cup.

Background
The sixth incarnation of the annual Canada Cup organised by Lap Chi Duong was hosted in a Holiday Inn in Toronto, Canada on October 28–30. Described by Motherboard as the "largest and most prestigious fighting game tournament in the country," the Canada Cup featured a $15,000 USD prize pool for its Street Fighter V tournament as well as a spot for the 2016 Capcom Cup. The Street Fighter tournament featured a "pool of death" set-up similar to that of NorCal Regionals the same year, allowing players to enter the competition at the door, though with a large disadvantage.

To promote the Super Smash Bros. Melee tournament, Duong "invaded" the Twitch streams of high-level Super Smash Bros. players Armada, Hungrybox, and Mang0 – using a donation of $895 USD in order to get their attention – asking them to attend the competition. Duong stated in an interview with Motherboard that the "Five Gods" of Super Smash Bros. are difficult to reach due to their large fanbase, giving him the idea of reaching them through a publicity stunt. The stunt greatly increased attendance of the Super Smash Bros. Melee tournament. Mang0 however pulled out of the tournament due to him wanting to spend time with his son on Halloween.

73 people entered the Super Street Fighter II Turbo tournament held at Canada Cup 2016; 18 more than in a similar tournament held at Evo 2016. Despite the age of the game, Red Bull stated that Super Street Fighter II Turbo is going through a kind of "North American renaissance", as new players enter the Street Fighter V scene with memories of their childhood. Canada Cup has been the biggest gathering of high level players of this game since 2014.

The Canada Cup was the first qualifying tournament for the 2017 King of Fighters XIV World Championship. The Super Smash Bros. for Wii U event was won by 15-year old Mexican, Leonardo "MKLeo" Pérez.

Street Fighter V tournament summary
The Street Fighter V tournament at Canada Cup 2016 featured various upsets and surprises. Norwegian player Arman "Phenom" Hanjani dominated most of the tournament – defeating Daigo Umehara 3-0 – until being defeated by Chris Tatarian. Though Kenneth "K-Brad" Bradley managed to defeat Infiltration in a 2-1 set, he lost to NuckleDu in a later round.

Canada Cup 2016 was the first Capcom Pro Tour Premier Event since The Fall Classic in October 2014 to be won by an American player: Du "NuckleDu" Dang. However, as he had already qualified for the Capcom Cup through the Global Leaderboards, NuckleDu's automatic qualification primarily freed up a spot for another high-ranking player. NuckleDu won the tournament after defeating Zhuojun "Xiao Hai" Zeng in the grand finals, playing a strong R. Mika.

Results

References

2016 fighting game tournaments